Mossa may refer to:

People
 Gustav-Adolf Mossa (1883-1971), French illustrator and writer
 Mossa (footballer), Spanish football player
 Mossa Bildner, Brazilian multi-disciplinary artist
 Kell Mossa, character in Pariah (comics)
 Vera Mossa (born 1964), Brazilian volleyball player
 Vico Mossa (1914-2003), Italian architect and writer
 Yasmín Esquivel Mossa (born 1963), Mexican lawyer and public official
mossa ASW (born 1526 BC),
 MOSES  dubbed in Islam

Places
 Mossa, Friuli-Venezia Giulia, Italy
 Santa Catalina de Mossa District, Peru